"Signature of Divine (Yahweh)" is the first single released off the album The Heat by Christian rock band Needtobreathe. It was released in the summer of 2007. The song was nominated for the "Rock/Contemporary Song of the Year" Dove Award for 2007.

Charts
The song reached No. 1 on the R&R CHR chart. It also was the No. 14 most played song in 2007 on Christian Hit Radio.

Reception
Signature of Divine (Yahweh) had very positive reviews by professionals. Allmusic said it "has its share of rich, sweeping gusto". Jesus Freak Hideout also was positive about the song, saying "[T]he record really hits the high note with soaring worship on "Signature of Divine (Yahweh)." It "arguably packs more punch… than a lot of songs coming from the worship genre today."

Awards

In 2008, the song was nominated for a Dove Award for Rock/Contemporary Recorded Song of the Year at the 39th GMA Dove Awards.

References

2007 singles
Needtobreathe songs
2007 songs
Atlantic Records singles